Impulse noise could mean:

Impulse noise (audio)
Electromagnetic interference
Burst noise